Kwadwo Opoku (born 13 July 2001), commonly known as Mahala, is a Ghanaian professional footballer who plays as a forward for Major League Soccer side Los Angeles FC.

Club career
Born in Accra, Opoku began his career at the Attram De Visser Soccer Academy before moving to the United States and signing with Major League Soccer side Los Angeles FC on 6 October 2020. He then made his professional debut for the club on 11 October 2020 against Seattle Sounders FC. He came on as a late stoppage time substitute for Bradley Wright-Phillips as Los Angeles FC won 3–1.

On 16 December 2020, Opoku scored his first goal for LAFC in the CONCACAF Champions League quarter-finals against Cruz Azul on a volley to give his side a 2–1 lead.

Career statistics

Club

Honors
Los Angeles FC
MLS Cup: 2022
Supporters' Shield: 2022

References

External links
Profile at the Los Angeles FC website

2001 births
Living people
Footballers from Accra
Ghanaian footballers
Association football forwards
Major League Soccer players
USL Championship players
Attram De Visser Soccer Academy players
Los Angeles FC players
Las Vegas Lights FC players
Ghanaian expatriate footballers
Ghanaian expatriate sportspeople in the United States
Expatriate soccer players in the United States